The 1985 Grand Prix d'Automne was the 79th edition of the Paris–Tours cycle race and was held on 6 October 1985. The race started in Créteil and finished in Chaville. The race was won by Ludo Peeters.

General classification

References

1985 in French sport
1985
1985 Super Prestige Pernod International